Elizabeth Shelby may refer to:

Elizabeth Shelby, Star Trek character on List of Star Trek characters (N–S)#Shelby
Elizabeth "Polly" Shelby, character in Peaky Blinders (TV series)